Pine Grove is an unincorporated community located in Clark County, Kentucky, United States. Its post office  is closed.

References

Unincorporated communities in Clark County, Kentucky
Unincorporated communities in Kentucky